Turbonilla murilloi is a species of sea snail, a marine gastropod mollusk in the family Pyramidellidae, the pyrams and their allies.

Description
The shell reaches a length of 1.5 mm and has a striped pattern.

Distribution
This species occurs in the Pacific Ocean off Fiji, the Solomon Islands and Vanuatu.

References

External links
 To Encyclopedia of Life
 To World Register of Marine Species

murilloi
Gastropods described in 2010